The Devils–Flyers rivalry is a rivalry between two teams in the NHL's Metropolitan Division. This rivalry has become quite intense in New Jersey itself, sometimes referred to as the "Battle of the Jersey Turnpike", with the northern part of the state being the Devils fanbase, while the southern part of the state is overwhelmingly Flyers fans due to South Jersey's close proximity to Philadelphia.

From the time the conferences were realigned and renamed prior to the  season until the next realignment at the end of the  season, the two teams won a combined total of 15 division championships of the 19 titles from the original Atlantic Division, 9–6 in the Devils' favor.

Early history
Prior to relocating to New Jersey, the only notable confrontation between these two franchises occurred in the 1978 Stanley Cup Preliminary Round where the Flyers swept the previously-located Colorado Rockies (NHL) in two games. Although these two teams faced each other on a regular basis since the Devils' relocation from Denver in 1982, the New Jersey–Philadelphia rivalry did not take off until their first playoff meeting since the Devils' relocation in the lockout-shortened 1994–95 season, when the Devils eliminated the Flyers in six games in the 1995 Eastern Conference Finals en route to winning the Stanley Cup. The turning point of the series came in Game 5, when Claude Lemieux scored from 65 feet out, sending a wobbly puck past Flyers goalie Ron Hextall, with 44 seconds left in regulation of a tie game. The series was considered an upset, as the Devils were the 5th seed in the Eastern Conference playoffs, while the Flyers had made a dramatic improvement to end their five-year playoff drought by winning the division and the 2nd seed in the East, and were led by eventual Hart Memorial Trophy winner, captain Eric Lindros. Lindros and Devils captain Scott Stevens were afterwards known for their on-ice feuds.

During the  regular season, the Devils were leading in both the Eastern Conference and the Atlantic Division, but their 10-game slump near the end of the season resulted the Flyers overtaking them for both the division title and the #1 seed in the East. They would meet once again in the 2000 Eastern Conference Finals; this time, the Flyers blew a 3-1 series lead over the Devils, including losing 3 of the 4 games played in Philadelphia. Game 7 of this series was the final game for Eric Lindros as a Flyer, suffering a concussion at the hands of Stevens, whose controversial hit was viewed by some as the key moment of the Devils' playoff run. The Devils would go on to win the Cup by beating the defending champion Dallas Stars in 6 games.

21st century
The Flyers also defeated the Devils in the 2010 Eastern Conference Quarterfinals, again 4 games to 1, en route to the Stanley Cup Finals. The latter series was considered a big upset, as the Devils won the Atlantic Division and the 2nd seed in the East while the Flyers clinched the 7th seed in a shootout victory over the New York Rangers on the last day of the regular season.

In the  season, Devils goalie Martin Brodeur broke Philadelphia legend (and fellow Montrealer) Bernie Parent's single season wins record of 47 by earning his 48th win against the Flyers. Flyers fans booed Brodeur and the milestone was not announced by the Flyers' PA announcer, Lou Nolan at game's end. Nevertheless, Parent offered his praise, even though he did not have the benefit of overtime or shootouts in his era (12 of Brodeur's 48 wins were in overtime or the shootout). This time, the milestone was announced by the PA announcer and was booed. Furthermore, on Sunday, March 1, 2009, Brodeur recorded his 100th career regular season shutout during a home game versus the Flyers. Brodeur recorded 27 saves in the 3-0 victory.

In , both teams were seemingly headed in different directions. The Devils finished under .500 for the first time since  and missed the playoffs, while the Flyers led the Atlantic Division steadily and won the division in their final game of the season.

Subsequent results proved otherwise.  The teams met in the 2012 Eastern Conference Semifinals, with the Flyers being heavily favored after dismantling Stanley Cup favorite Pittsburgh in the first round.  However, after losing game one, New Jersey won the next four to win the series, 4–1, en route to the Stanley Cup Finals New Jersey's victory in game four occurred on Brodeur's 40th birthday, giving him playoff victories over the Flyers in his 20s, 30s, and 40s. The series was characterized by a relentless Devils' forecheck and a virtual shutdown of Philadelphia's offensive weapons.  The Devils would advance to defeat the rival New York Rangers in the Eastern Conference Championship series.  However, the trend of defeating the Flyers en route to winning the Stanley Cup was broken when the Los Angeles Kings, coincidentally featuring former Flyers Mike Richards, Simon Gagne, Justin Williams, Jeff Carter and John Stevens defeated the Devils 4–2 to win their first Stanley Cup.

The  season marked the first time that both the Devils and Flyers missed the playoffs since the Devils started playing in New Jersey.

Rivalry outside NHL
The rivalry has taken on an even further extension;  the Flyers had an ECHL affiliate in Trenton, New Jersey - the Trenton Titans, from 1999 - including the 2005 Kelly Cup Championship - to 2006, when the team was sold to the Devils, which flipped the team's affiliation after the 2006–07 ECHL season and nickname to reflect its new ownership and identity, rebranding as the Trenton Devils. Intending to establish the Devils fanbase further south in New Jersey, the rebranding instead alienated a large segment of fans in the central New Jersey area, where the Flyers have a significantly larger fanbase than the Devils. Coupled with poor performance on the ice (missing the playoffs 3 out of 4 seasons) and attendance figures near the bottom of the league, the Devils suspended operations in July 2011. A week later, the franchise was revived under the original Titans brand and reestablished affiliation with the Flyers.

For several years, the American Hockey League had a rivalry between the Adirondack Red Wings and Capital District Islanders/Albany River Rats, both served by Interstate 87. After the former team folded, the area was without an AHL team until 2009, when the Philadelphia Phantoms moved and became the Adirondack Phantoms, still affiliated with the Flyers. The River Rats moved to Charlotte and were replaced by the Albany Devils in 2010, so the Adirondack-Albany rivalry took on new significance due to the teams' parent clubs until 2014, when the Phantoms moved to Lehigh Valley.

Notes

See also
 Flyers–Rangers rivalry
 Eagles–Giants rivalry
 Mets–Phillies rivalry

References

National Hockey League rivalries
History of the New Jersey Devils
History of the Philadelphia Flyers